CandyGirls are a line of realistic sex dolls manufactured by Orient Industries in Japan. The dolls have a reputation for aesthetics (highly detailed, lifelike faces), potentially occupying a similar market niche as that of the premium American-made RealDolls. (While the low-end product series of CandyGirl dolls, hhh Petit Pure, are priced at $1,383, a high-end CandyGirl doll costs about $7,000; RealDolls start at around $6,000.) The dolls are not sold directly to customers outside Japan, although it is possible to purchase them using intermediaries based in Japan ("shopping deputies").

See also 

 Agalmatophilia

External links 
 

Japanese inventions
Sex dolls 
Sexuality in Japan